Eddy Island is an uninhabited island in Qikiqtaaluk Region, Nunavut, Canada. Situated in the eastern portion of Hudson Bay, it is one of 24 islands that make up the Ottawa Islands.

Other islands in the vicinity include J. Gordon Island, Pattee Island, Gilmour Island, and Perley Island.

References

Islands of Hudson Bay
Uninhabited islands of Qikiqtaaluk Region